Stephanus Hendrik Coetzee (born 9 January 1992 in Worcester) is a South African rugby union player for the Seattle Seawolves in Major League Rugby (MLR) in the United States. His regular playing position is hooker.

Career

Youth

Coetzee represented  at various youth levels, playing at the Under-16 Grant Khomo Week in 2008, the Under-18 Academy Week in 2009 and the Under-18 Craven Week in 2010.

Western Province / Stormers

He was included in the  squad for the 2013 Vodacom Cup and made his senior debut when he started in their opening match of the season against neighbours  in Ceres. He played in eight matches during the competition, starting six of them.

Coetzee was subsequently named on the bench for the clash.

Griquas

He moved to Kimberley for the 2015 season to join .

Seattle Seawolves

Coetzee joined Major League Rugby side Seattle Seawolves prior to the 2019 season., having a prominent performance with 8 tries assists in regular season and qualifying seawolves to playoff for the second time.

References

1992 births
Living people
Alumni of Paarl Boys' High School
Expatriate rugby union players in the United States
Rugby union players from Worcester, South Africa
Rugby union hookers
Seattle Seawolves players
South African expatriate rugby union players
South African expatriate sportspeople in the United States
Southern Kings players
Stormers players
Western Province (rugby union) players
Cheetahs (rugby union) players
Griquas (rugby union) players
Sharks (Currie Cup) players
Sharks (rugby union) players
New England Free Jacks players